The Vyas Samman is a literary award in India, first awarded in 1991. It is awarded annually by the K.K. Birla Foundation and includes a cash payout of Rs 4,00,000 (as of 2019).

To be eligible for the award, the literary work must be in the Hindi language and have been published in the past 10 years.

Recipients
The people who have been awarded the Vyas Samman are:

References

Indian literary awards
Hindi